Athlone Towncentre is a shopping centre located in Athlone, County Westmeath. It opened in November 2007. The shopping centre is the largest shopping centre in the Irish midlands with over 13,000 square metres of retail space, over 60 stores, consisting of many big retail brands, such as, ZARA,  TK Maxx, Marks and Spencer, River Island, Starbucks, Tommy Hilfiger, JD Sports, Topshop, Next, Skechers and H&M. This is located at the former Royal Hoey Hotel which closed in 2002, and was demolished in 2005, to make way for the Athlone Towncentre.

The shopping centre is located close to the centre of Athlone town, on a site accessible from Dublin Gate Street and Gleeson Street.

The 4-star Sheraton Athlone Hotel adjoins the site and has 161 beds.

References 

Athlone
Shopping centres in the Republic of Ireland
2007 establishments in Ireland